The Battle of Gomit was fought in 1445 between the Ethiopian Empire and a powerful Muslim army under the Adal Sultanate. The Ethiopians were led by Emperor Zara Yaqob, while the forces of Adal were led by Sultan Badlay ibn Sa'ad ad-Din. The Ethiopian army was victorious, and Badlay was slain. After dismembering the Adal sultan's body and plundering his treasures, the Emperor of Ethiopia decided not to conquer the Adalites, believing they were outside of the Christian boundary and shouldn't be included in his kingdom. However historian Hassan states Adal's powerful counter attacks persuaded Ethiopian monarch from attempting to occupy the state.

Background
Badlay first invaded the Ethiopian province of Dawaro in 1443, and again in 1445, but while in Dago, the Emperor Zara Yaqob received news that the Sultan Badlay ibn Sa'ad ad-Din had embarked on a war against him. He then marched south with the army of his vassal Hassab Bawassan.
 
Garad Mohammed, the governor of Hadiya Province and the emperor's father in-law, offered his help to both the sultan and the emperor. The emperor, who suspected the Garad of dessertion due to his Muslim faith, ordered him to camp near Ayfars while the trusting sultan was deceived.

References

Battles involving Ethiopia
15th century in Ethiopia
Battles of the Middle Ages
Conflicts in 1445
Battles involving the Adal Sultanate
Battles of the Abyssinian–Adal war